Sri Sumedha Maha Vidyalaya is a government school in Matara, Sri Lanka.  It was established in 1894.

History 
The school was established in 1894 by the Methodist Church with eleven students and was known as Batathumbe Methodist College for several decades. The first principal of this school was B. De Silva and there were two teachers. The first student of this school was a principal of a school.

The school became a government school in 1912 and the name was changed into Malimbada Sri Sumedha Maha Vidyalaya as a proposal of Mr Samarawickrama, a former principal of this school.
Formerly, there were only primary and secondary classes, but the permission was granted to start Advanced Level classes on 10 January 1982. In 1990 R. K. Wijesekara took over as principal of the school.

Principals from 1948

Houses 
Students are divided into four houses. The house names are derived from the past kings of Sri Lanka.

 Vijaya - In honour of King Vijaya
 Gemunu - In honour of King Dutugamunu
 Gajaba - In honour of King Gajabahu I

Reference 

1894 establishments in Ceylon
Buddhist schools in Sri Lanka
Educational institutions established in 1894
Former Methodist schools in Sri Lanka
Provincial schools in Sri Lanka
Schools in Matara District